Graham Leo Armstrong (May 30, 1918 – June 25, 1960) was an American football tackle who played two seasons with the Cleveland Rams of the National Football League. He played college football at John Carroll University and Cathedral Latin High School in Cleveland, Ohio. He was also a member of the Buffalo Bills of the All-America Football Conference.

References

External links
Just Sports Stats

1918 births
1960 deaths
Players of American football from Cleveland
American football tackles
John Carroll Blue Streaks football players
Cleveland Rams players
Buffalo Bills (AAFC) players